Seongjong is the temple name of two Korean monarchs:

 King Seongjong of Goryeo (r. 981–997)
 King Seongjong of Joseon (r. 1469–1494)

See also 
 Chengzong (disambiguation), the Chinese romanization

Temple name disambiguation pages